Monen is a kabbalistic concept covering that branch of occultism which deals with the reading of the future by the computation of time and observation of planets and stars (astrology).

References

Kabbalah
Kabbalistic words and phrases